Chalhuacocha (possibly from Quechua challwa fish, qucha lake, "fish lake") is a lake in  Peru located in the Junín Region, Jauja Province, Canchayllo District. It lies northeast of the lakes Llacsacocha and Mancacocha, east of the mountain Chalhuacocha  and north of the mountain Huiracocha.

References 

Lakes of Peru
Lakes of Junín Region